Michael Saruni (born June 18, 1995) is a Kenyan collegiate middle-distance runner. He was the former world record holder for the indoor 600 m with a time of 1:14.79, set in January 2018. Representing the University of Texas in El Paso, he also set the all-time collegiate record for 800 m in April 2018, with a time of 1:43.25. 

Michael Saruni graduated from Kabimoi High School in Baringo County - Eldama Ravine, Kenya.

In 2017 NCAA Division I Indoor Track and Field Championships 800 meters final, Saruni won in 1:47, but was disqualified after bumping Piazza who cut into lane 1 in front of Saruni.

In 2017 NCAA Division I Outdoor Track and Field Championships 800 final, champion Emmanuel Korir tripped Saruni at 600 meters.

Saruni was controversially excluded from the Kenyan 2017 World Championships team by Athletics Kenya due to a misunderstanding of IAAF policies.

In 2018 NCAA Division I Indoor Track and Field Championships 800 meters final, Saruni won in 1:45.15.

Michael Saruni, a sophomore UTEP Miners (University of Texas El Paso), set the NCAA 800 meters record at the 2018 Desert Heat Classic in Tucson, Arizona in 1:43.25 improving NCAA 800 m record of Donavan Brazier (1:43.55 in 2016).

In 2018 NCAA Division I Outdoor Track and Field Championships 800 meters final, Saruni placed 3rd in 1:45.31.

He qualified to represent Kenya at the 2020 Summer Olympics.

In 2022, Saruni was given a provisional suspension for anti-doping rules violations.

Competitions

References 

Living people
1995 births
Kenyan male middle-distance runners
World record holders in athletics (track and field)
United States collegiate record holders in athletics (track and field)
UTEP Miners men's track and field athletes
People from Baringo County
Kenyan expatriates in the United States
Athletes (track and field) at the 2020 Summer Olympics
Olympic athletes of Kenya